Daniel MacCarthy Reagh ( – 1691), also called Donal, was an Irish Jacobite politician and soldier. He represented Bandonbridge in the Patriot Parliament and fought and died for King James II at the Battle of Aughrim.

Birth and origins 
MacCarthy was the second son of Cormac MacCarthy Reagh and his wife Ellen MacCarty. His father was esquire of Kilbrittain. His paternal grandfather was Donal MacCarthy Reagh of Kilbrittain. His father's family were the MacCarthy Reagh, a Gaelic Irish dynasty that branched from the MacCarthy-Mor line with Donal Maol MacCarthy Reagh, the first independent ruler of Carbery.

MacCarthy's mother was a daughter of Charles MacCarthy, 1st Viscount Muskerry. His mother's family were the MacCarthys of Muskerry, who also had branched from the MacCarthy-Mor line.

Raised a regiment for James II 
In 1688 MacCarthy raised an Irish regiment of infantry in support of King James II during the Glorious Revolution.

MP 
In 1689 he was elected as one of the two Members of Parliament for Bandonbridge in the Patriot Parliament called by James II of England, which met between May and July 1689.

Marriage 
MacCarthy married Maria daughter of Richard Townsend, a Protestant. Daniel and Maria had two daughters who died unmarried.

Later career and death at the Battle of Aughrim 
He served in the Jacobite Irish army during the Williamite War in Ireland. He was appointed a deputy lieutenant of County Cork in 1690. He was killed at the Battle of Aughrim on 12 July 1691.

References

Citations

Sources 

  – Infantry
  – to 1603
  – Irish stem
  – Normans, English, Huguenots etc. (for Patriot Parliament)
  – Morres to O'Callaghan

 
 

Year of birth unknown
1691 deaths
17th-century Irish people
Deputy Lieutenants of County Cork
Irish Jacobites
Irish MPs 1689
Irish soldiers in the army of James II of England
Irish soldiers in the French Army
Daniel
Members of the Parliament of Ireland (pre-1801) for County Cork constituencies